Jacaranda ulei is a flowering tree native to the Cerrado region of Brazil. It was first described by Édouard Bureau and Karl Moritz Schumann in 1897.

Description
The leaves are 6 to 10 cm in length and bipinnate, having between 8 and 12 pinnae and 6 to 16 leaflets. Leaflets are 15 to 20 cm long, 3 to 5 cm wide and "narrowly oblong" in shape. The flowers are deep purple in colour and arranged in a branched, Panicle form. They are 5 to 10mm long and 4 to 7mm wide with 5 shallow dentate. The fruit is woody and "round to elliptic" in shape, growing 3.5 to 5.5 cm long and 3 to 4 cm wide.

The species is a resprouter, with its root system allowing it to survive wild fires and droughts seen in the savanna ecosystem of the Cerrado region of Brazil.

Uses
The roots of the plant have been used as a traditional folk remedy to treat urinary tract infections, amoebiasis, backache, rheumatism and skin disorders.

References

ulei
Trees of Brazil
Flora of the Cerrado